Srifa is a town in Southern Lebanon, located in Tyre District, Governorate of South Lebanon. It is located 22 kilometres east of the city Tyros and 90 kilometers south of the capital Beirut. It is the birthplace of Rima Fakih, Miss USA 2010.

Name

According to E. H. Palmer, the origin of the name is Sref. It has been suggested that the name means melting and purifying metals(the place of purification and smelting of metals)or it means "casting dirhams”.

History
In 1875, during the late Ottoman era,   Victor Guérin found here an ancient column, and a few cut stones, proving that the place was an ancient site. Guérin found that the village had  150 Metawileh villagers.

In 1881, the PEF's Survey of Western Palestine (SWP) described it: "A village, built of stone, containing about 200 Metawileh, it is situated on a hill, and surrounded by olives, figs, and arable land. Water from a spring; and cisterns in the village."

The village was heavily bombed during the 2006 Lebanon War.
On July 12, the Israelis killed 4 civilians in the village, while on July 19, they killed 17 Hezbollah fighters and 5 civilians.

References

Bibliography

External links
Survey of Western Palestine, Map 2:   IAA, Wikimedia commons
Srifa, Localiban

Populated places in Tyre District
Shia Muslim communities in Lebanon